Karomia speciosa  is an African deciduous large shrub or bushy tree up to 7 m, and relocated to the family Lamiaceae from Verbenaceae. It is one of 9 species in the genus Karomia, a genus containing species previously classified in Holmskioldia, and is closely related to Clerodendrum. The only remaining species in the genus is Holmskioldia sanguinea, occurring in the foothills of the Himalayas.

Karomia speciosa is found in the northern parts of South Africa, Eswatini and north into tropical Africa and Madagascar, growing in bush or wooded areas on hot, dry, rocky slopes and riverine thickets. Producing showy, mauve and purple flowers in profusion, the species is either single- or multi-stemmed, with pale, smooth grayish-brown bark. The softly pubescent leaves have coarsely toothed margins, are dark green above and a paler green below. The papery calyx is dusty-pink or mauve in colour, while the bilabiate corolla is deep-blue or violet.

References

External links
Gallery
Kristin Bain watercolour

Lamiaceae
Shrubs
Flora of Africa
Plants described in 1920